Heleini is a tribe of darkling beetles in the family Tenebrionidae. There are more than 40 genera in Heleini, found in Australasia.

Genera
These genera belong to the tribe Heleini:

 Agastenes R. Lucas, 1920
 Aglypta Gebien, 1908
 Amarygmimus Bates, 1873
 Amphianax Bates, 1873
 Asphalus Pascoe, 1868
 Atoreuma Gebien, 1941
 Bassianus Matthews & Doyen, 1989
 Bolbophanes Carter, 1913
 Boreosaragus Matthews, 1993
 Brises Pascoe, 1869
 Byallius Pascoe, 1869
 Camponotiphilus Lea, 1914
 Celibe Boisduval, 1835
 Cerodolus Sharp, 1886
 Cillibus Matthews, 1993
 Cyphaleus Westwood, 1841
 Dysarchus Pascoe, 1866
 Edylius Champion, 1894
 Emcephalus W. Kirby, 1828
 Helea Latreille, 1804
 Hemicyclus Westwood, 1841
 Meneristes Pascoe, 1869
 Mimopeus Pascoe, 1866
 Mithippia Pascoe, 1869
 Mitrothorax Carter, 1914
 Nyctozoilus Guérin-Méneville, 1831
 Olisthaena Erichson, 1842
 Onotrichus Carter, 1911
 Ospidus Pascoe, 1866
 Pachycoelia Boisduval, 1835
 Paraphanes W.J. MacLeay, 1887
 Phanechloros Matthews & Bouchard, 2008
 Platyphanes Westwood, 1849
 Prophanes Westwood, 1849
 Pseudhelops Guérin-Méneville, 1841
 Pterohelaeus Brême, 1842
 Saragus Erichson, 1842
 Sloanea Carter, 1916
 Styrus Bates, 1873
 Sympetes Pascoe, 1866
 Trichosaragus Blackburn, 1890

References

Further reading

 
 

Tenebrionoidea